Nosy Alañaña Light, also known as Île aux Prunes Light, is an active lighthouse in Île aux Prunes, Toamasina Province, Madagascar. At a height of  it is the twenty-fourth tallest "traditional lighthouse" in the world, as well as the tallest in Africa.

The island is accessible by boat, and the site is open, but the tower is closed to the public.

See also

 List of lighthouses in Madagascar
 List of tallest lighthouses in the world

References

Lighthouses completed in 1932
Lighthouses in Madagascar
Toamasina Province
20th-century architecture in Madagascar